T. N. Krishnachandran (born 16 June 1960) is an Indian actor, playback singer, and dubbing artist in Malayalam cinema and television.

Career

His debut movie was Rathinirvedam in 1978. He was the voice for actor Vineeth and Rahman and also for Kunchacko Boban in Aniyathi Pravu. He won best dubbing artiste Kerala State Award for Kabuliwala (Vineeth) and Aniyathi Pravu (Kunchacko Boban). He acted in approximately 30 Malayalam movies and sang almost 1000 songs in Malayalam and Tamil movies, including many songs for Ilaiyaraaja in Tamil movies. Music director Ilaiyaraaja introduced him to the Tamil film industry in Kozhi Koovuthu.

Personal life

Krishnachandran was born as the elder of two children of P. Narayana Raja and Nalini Raja of Nilambur Kovilakam  Nilambur, Malappuram district (Then in Kozhikode district) on 16 June 1960. He has a younger sister named Meera.  He had his primary education from GMHS, Nilambur. He pursued a bachelor's degree in Music with first rank from Calicut University from Government College Chittur, Palakkad. He holds an M.A. in Music at Madras University.

He married South Indian actress Vanitha Krishnachandran on 11 May 1986 at Mookambika Temple, Kollur, after a brief spell of dating. They have a daughter named Amritavarshini, born in 1990. They lived at Chennai from 1986 till 2005. They are currently settled at Thiruvananthapuram. His daughter was married in 2016 to Navneet and is currently settled in Canada.

Awards
 1994 Kerala State Film Award for Best Dubbing Artist - Kabooliwala for Vineeth
 1997 Kerala State Film Award for Best Dubbing Artist - Aniyathi Pravu for Kunchacko Boban

Television 
TV serials
Parvathy (Surya TV)
Ayirathil Oruval (Mazhavil Manorama) 
Chempattu (Asianet)
Bhadra (Surya TV)
Aanpirannol (Amrita TV)
 Ennum Sammatham  (Mazhavil Manorama)
Mazhayethum Munpey (Amrita TV)

As Host
Swarasangamam (ACV)
Swarnachamaram (Amrita TV)
Suvarnageetham (Mathrbhoomi)
As Judge 
Sreshtabharatham (Amrita TV)

Filmography

As an actor
Aanandham Paramanandham (2022)
Chilappol Penkutty (2019)
 Naam  (2018)
 Rockstar (2015 film) (2015)
 Artist (2013)
 Omega.exe (2013) 
 Ravu (2013)
 Orkkuka Vallappozhum (2009)
 Yuvajanotsavam (1986) as Omanakuttan
 Thozhil Allengil Jail (1985)
 Sandhyakkenthinu Sindooram (1984)
 Unaroo (1984)
 Belt Mathai (1983) as Khadir Kutty 
 Irattimadhuram (1982) as Ramu
 Ormakkai (1982)
 Vidhichathum Kothichathum (Kasthoori) (1982)
 Ee Nadu (1982) as Sasi
 Kaanthavalayam (1980)
 Sakthi (1980)
 Lajjaavathi (1979) 
 Lovely (1979) 
 Raathrikal Ninakku Vendi (1979)
 Koumaarapraayam (1979) as Joy 
 Raappadikalude Gaadha (1978)
 Rathinirvedam (1978) as Pappu

As dubbing artist
Johnnie Walker - voice for Jeet Upendra 
Five Star Hospital - voice for Vishnu
Rathilayam - voice for Rajkumar
Chevalier Michael - voice for Anand Babu
Ishtamanu Nooru Vattam - voice for Shiju
Naalamkettile Nalla Thampimar - voice for Vignesh
Indraprastham - voice for Akshay Anand
Rangam - voice for Ravindran
Aniyathipravu - voice for Kunchacko Boban
Sargam - voice for Vineeth
Parinayam - voice for Vineeth
Highway - voice for Vineeth
Rithubhedam - voice for Vineeth
Kabooliwala - voice for Vineeth
Kamaladalam - voice for Vineeth
Ennennum Kannettante - voice for Sangeeth (hero)
Layanam - Voice for Nandhu (hero)
Kerala House Udan Vilpanakku - voice for Jayasurya
Perumthachan - voice for Prashanth
Poonilamazha - voice for Sanjay Mitra
Oru Vadakkan Veeragatha - voice for Sanjay Mitra
Vaisali - voice for Sanjay Mitra
Mazhavilkoodaram - voice for Rahman
Aparatha - voice for Rahman
Charithram - voice for Rahman
Kariyilakkattu Pole - voice for Rahman
Ee Thanalil Ithiri Nerum - voice for Rahman
Katha Ithuvare - voice for Rahman
King Soloman - voice for Rahman
Ivide Ee Theerathu - voice for Rahman
Kanamarayathu - voice for Rahman
Indriyam - voice for Vikram
Mayoora Nritham - voice for Vikram
Mafiya - voice for Vikram
Itha Oru Snehagatha - voice for Vikram
Summer Palace - voice for Ancil
Chilambu - voice for Rahman
Kannezhuthi Pottum Thottu - voice for Abbas
Pranayamanithooval - voice for Vineeth Kumar

As a playback singer
 "Aruthe Aruthe Enne Thallaruthe"... Maniyan Pilla Adhava Maniyan Pilla (1981)
 "Maarolsavam"... Aa Raathri (1982)
 "Vellichillum Vithari"... Ina (1982)
 "Aralipoonkaadukal"... Ina (1982)
 "Kinaavinte Varambathu"... Ina (1982)
 "Thattedi Sosamme"...	Ee Nadu (1982)
 "Aakashagangayil Varnangalaal" [D]...	Sindoora Sandhyakku Mounam (1982)
 "Manjumma Vekkum"...	Idavela (1982)
 "Happy Christhmas"...	Ormakkayi (1982)
 "Thanka Thanki Thaithaaro"...	Aaroodham (1983)
 "Orajnjaatha Pushpam Vidarnnu"... Paalam (1983)
 "Vellitheril"... Engine Nee Marakkum (1983)
 "Romeo Juliet"... Engine Nee Marakkum (1983)
 "Brahmaswaroopini Devi"... Deepaaradhana (1983)
 "Pokkerikkante Chukkukaappi" [Aaluva Chanthayilu]... Belt Mathai (1983)
 "Swarga Vaathil Thurannu Thannu"... Iniyenkilum (1983)
 "Pranaya Swaram Hrudaya Swaram"... Naanayam (1983)
 "Jhil Jhil Jhillennu"... Kaikeyi (1983)
 "Manjum Kulirum"... Sandhyaykku Virinja Poovu (1983)
 "Kaatte Kaatte"... Oomakkuyil (1983)
 "Olangalilulayum"...	Sandhyamayangum Neram (1983)
 "Never On A Sunday"... America America (1983)
 "Kadhaparayaam"... Aadhipathyam (1983)
 "Sougandhikangal Vidarnnu"...	Mahaabali (1983)
 "Manjaadikutti Malavedathi"... Ee Yugam (1983)
 "Jeevane"... Snehabandham (1983)
 "Thaarunyam Neeraadi"... Raagasangamam (1983)
 "Roopam Madhuritharoopam"... Makale Maappu Tharoo (1984)
 "Swapnangal Inacherum"... Nishedhi (1984)
 "Kalyaanam Kalyaanam"... Oru Kochu Kadha Aarum Parayatha Kadha (1984)
 "Kasthoorimaan"... Kaanaamarayathu (1984)
 "Alliyilam Poovo"... Mangalam Nerunnu (1984)
 "Peda Peda"... Chemmeenkettu (1984)
 "Innente Khalbile"...	KoottinilamKili (1984)
 "Pattiche Pattiche" (Kettiyone)... Kadamattathachan (1984)
 "Kuppinipattaalam"... Onnaanu Nammal (1984)
 "Kaikalkottippaaduka"... Piriyilla Naam (1984)
 "Raajave Raajave"... Ithaa Innu Muthal (1984)
 "Naalukaashum Kayyil Vechu"... Chakkarayumma (1984)
 "Nammude Ee College"... Paavam Poornima (1984)
 "Deepame"... Unaroo (1984)
 "Shivamkari Sadaa"...	Sandhyaykkenthinu Sindooram (1984)
 "Aadi Brahmamunarnnu"... Ezhu Swarangal (1984)
 "Mounam Pallaviyam"... Ezhu Swarangal (1984)
 "Devadoothar Paadi"... Kaathodu Kaathoram (1985)
 "Sangamam Ee Poonkaavanam"... Koodum Thedi (1985)
 "Penne Nin Premathin"... Soundaryappinakkam (1985)
 "Ayyayyo Ammavi"... Muhoortham 11:30 (1985)
 "Poovaam Manchalil Moolum Thennale"... Eeran Sandhya (1985)
 "Panchaara Panchaayathil"... Nerariyum Nerathu (1985)
 "Kopam Kollumbol"... Ithu Nalla Thamaasha (1985)
 "Malaraayennum"... Guerilla (1985)
 "Maathala Mottu"... Ezhumuthal Onpathuvare (1985)
 "Kuthira Pole"... Muthaaramkunnu P.O. (1985)
 "Karimbin Poovinakkare"... Karimbinpoovinakkare (1985)
 "Onnaam Thumbi"... Makan Ente Makan (1985)
 "Cherunnu Njangalonnaay"... Kadha Ithuvare (1985)
 "Tak Tak Tak"... Avidatheppole Ivideyum (1985)
 "Pokaathe Pokaathe"... Angaadikkappurathu (1985)
 "Azhakinoraaraadhana"... Angaadikkappurathu (1985)
 "Manjin Kulirala"... Chorakku Chora (1985)
 "Vanashree Mukham"... Rangam (1985)
 "Aaraarum Ariyaathe"... Rangam (1985)
 "Thamburaan Paattinu"... Rangam (1985)
 "Kaaveriyaaril"... Black Mail (1985)
 "Ponmarakkuda Choodi"... Manaykkale Thatha (1985)
 "Premalekhanam"... Priye Priyadarshini (1985)
 "Ee Aanandam"... Ore Raktham (1985)
 "Ravi Kandathellaam"... Ore Raktham (1985)
 "Thenaari Thenkaashi"... Adiverukal (1986)
 "Nilaavala Thalirkkudil"... Kulambadikal (1986)
 "Romapuriyle"... Annoru Raavil (1986)
 "My Name Is Mikki"... Annoru Raavil (1986)
 "Kadalilaki Karayodu Cholli"... Pranaamam (1986)
 "Oru Diamond Rani"... Priyamvadakkoru Pranayageetham (1986)
 "Porinu Poru"... Priyamvadakkoru Pranayageetham (1986)
 "Pralayapayodhi"... Yuvajanolsavam (1986)
 "Ambalamukku Kazhinjal"... Yuvajanolsavam (1986)
 "Oh Sugandha Vanapushpangal"... Pidikittappulli (Kaanan Pokunna Pooram) (1986)
 "Kandu Njan Kandu"... Malarum Kiliyum (1986)
 "Mohamaakum Naagangal"... Karinaagam (1986)
 "Malarmaari Madhumaari"... Bhagavaan (1986)
 "Ullam Thulli"... Ennu Naadhante Nimmi (1986)
 "Medakkonnaykku"... Abhayam Thedi (1986)
 "Swarnathaalam"... Chila Nimishangalil (1986)
 "Velli Meeshakkaara"... Prathikalethedi (1986)
 "Yaamam Madabharam"... Ahalya (1986)
 "Aalolam"... Avalude Kadha (1987)
 "Kanmaniye"... Oru Minna Minunginte Nurungu Vettam (1987)
 "Madhumozhi"... Oru Minna Minunginte Nurungu Vettam (1987)
 "Mele Nandanam Poothe"... Neelakkurinji Poothappol (1987)
 "Moham Nee"... Kurukkan Raajaavaayi (1987)
 "Muthukkudangale" [Vellinilaavoru]... Naalkkavala (1987)
 "Aadaam Namukku Paadaam"... Aalippazhangal (1987)
 "Naadodumbol Naduve"... P.C. 369 (1987)
 "Innee Naadin Raajaavu"... Oru Sindoorapottinte Ormakku (1987)
 "Madhumadhuram"... Ithrayum Kaalam (1987)
 "Mannaanithu"... Ithrayum Kaalam (1987)
 "Pranayavenuvil Ethethu Swaramo"... Swaralayam (1987)
 "Chirichu Chirichu"... Swaralayam (1987)
 "Kaanunnu Ningalee Kaalathin Vaibhavam... Abkaari (1988)
 "Thenmazhayo"... Daisy (1988)
 "Snehamithallo Bhoovileeshan"... Aadyapaapam (1988)
 "Poomozhi Sakhi Nin"... Rahasyam Paramarahasyam (1988)
 "Oh Sugandha Vanapushpangal"... Janmashathru (1988)
 "Julie My Love"... Samhaaram (1988)
 "Nithya Raagini"... Samhaaram (1988)
 "Chumbikkaan"... Samhaaram (1988)
 "Kandittilla Njaan" [Chandanathin Gandhamarinju]... Chakkikkotha Chankaran (1989)
 "Odaathe Maane" [Panthu]... Chakkikkotha Chankaran (1989)
 "Neru Neru"... Varnam (1989)
 "Nadiyorathile"... Naaduvaazhikal (1989)
 "Nilkku Nee"... Kalpana House (1989)
 "Puthiya Bhoomiyil Puthiya Veedhiyil"... Lillyppookkal Chuvannappol (1989)
 "Vaathapi Ganapathim Bhaje"... Lillyppookkal Chuvannappol (1989)
 "Aarari Raarariro"... Mizhiyorangalil (1989)
 "Karnikaaram Pookkum" [Hamsame Nee – Bit]... Mizhiyorangalil (1989)
 "Madhuvaani"... Mizhiyorangalil (1989)
 "Kaanan Njaanoru"... Thaalam (1990)
 "Kallolam"... Chuvanna Kannukal (1990)
 "Hridayavaniyil"... 101 Raavukal (1990)
 "Thaanaaro"... Kaakkathollaayiram (1991)
 "Mele Chandrika"... Bhoomika (1991)
 "Nirakkudukka"... Kankettu (1991)
 "Nakshathram Minnunna"... Mimics Parade (1991)
 "Pookkadambilithirikkudanna Neetti Odi Vannu"... Arangu (1991)
 "Premam Aadyathe"... Teenage Love (1991)
 "Thalamele Randambili"... Naattuvisesham (1991)
 "Kanakathaarame"... Nagarathil Samsaaravishayam (1991)
 "Naavum Neeti Virunnu"... Cheppukilukkana Changaathi (1991)
 "Thamberin Thaalam"... Thalasthaanam (1992)
 "Ragam Thaanam"... Sooryagaayathri (1992)
 "Pinneyum Paadiyo"... Kallanum Policum (1992)
 "Bhaagyam Vannu"... Chevalier Michael (1992)
 "Kannaadikkaavilile"... Chevalier Michael (1992)
 "Mele Mele"... Mahaanagaram (1992)
 "Neelakurukkan"... Kaasargode Khaadarbhai (1992)
 "Maanathe Veettil"... Maanthrikacheppu (1992)
 "Chakravarthini"... Ambathu Lakshavum Maruthi Kaarum (1992)
 "Thappu Tatti"... Sthalathe Pradhaana Payyans (1993)
 "Panineerppoovin Naanam"... Ghoshayaathra (1993)
 "Mungi Mungi Muthupongi"... Jackpot (1993)
 "I Love"... Gaandeevam (1994)
 "Aararivum"... CID Unnikrishnan B.A. BEd (1994)
 "Baggy Jeansum"... Sainyam (1994)
 "Nenchil Idanenchil"... Sainyam (1994)
 "Panchaarappaattum" [D]... Tharavaadu (Chathurvarnyam) (1994)
 "Melevaanam"... Kadalpponnu (1994)
 "Pasumpon"... Thamarai Poovukum (1995)
 "Oru Vellithaambalam"... Puthukkottayile Puthumanavaalan (1995)
 "Kaalam Kalikaalam"... Malayala Maasam Chingam Onninu (1996)
 "Ragam Paadi"... Hamsageetham (1996)
 "Shankholi Doore"... Hamsageetham (1996)
 "Theyyaare"... Anubhoothi (1997)
 "Dhinna Dhinna"... Gangothri (1997)
 "Thappum Kottaathappaani"... Kudamaattam (1997)
 "Nercha Kunkuma"... Mannaadiyaar Penninu Chenkotta Chekkan (1997)
 "Mindanda Mindanda"... Vaachalam (1997)
 "Kuttaalam Aruviyile"... Over To Delhi (1997)
 "Varnatheril Vannu Vasantham"... Neelaanjanam (1998)
 "Thaalolam Paadan"...	Aanamuttathe Aangalamar (Manayoorile Manikyam) (2000)
 "Kaliyaattam Thullalle"... Daivathinte Makan (2000)
 "Mannil Ningal"... Agniyasthram (1985)
 "O Marimaayan Kaviyalle"... Ivan Megharoopan (2012)

References

http://cinidiary.com/peopleinfo.php?sletter=B&pigsection=Actor&picata=1
http://www.malayalachalachithram.com/movieslist.php?a=735
 https://web.archive.org/web/20141026194408/http://www.yentha.com/news/view/4/INTERVIEW-OF-THE-WEEK-The-Voice-Of-Youth
https://web.archive.org/web/20131010114146/http://www.metromatinee.com/artist/Krishnachandran-2472

External links

Krishnachandran at MSI

Indian male film actors
Male actors from Kerala
Kerala State Film Award winners
Male actors in Tamil cinema
Male actors in Malayalam cinema
20th-century Indian male actors
21st-century Indian male actors
Indian male playback singers
Malayalam playback singers
Living people
1960 births
20th-century Indian singers
21st-century Indian singers
People from Malappuram
Singers from Kerala
Film musicians from Kerala
20th-century Indian male singers
21st-century Indian male singers
Indian actors